Yeo Guat Kwang (born 27 January 1961) is a former Singaporean politician. A former member of the governing People's Action Party (PAP), he was the Member of Parliament (MP) representing the Ang Mo Kio–Hougang ward of Ang Mo Kio GRC between 2011 and 2015.

Education
Yeo attended The Chinese High School and Nanyang Junior College, before graduating from the National University of Singapore in 1986 with a Bachelor of Arts degree in social sciences.

He subsequently went on to complete a postgraduate diploma in education at the National Institute of Education at the Nanyang Technological University in 1987. 

He also completed a joint programme at the NUS Business School and Lee Kuan Yew School of Public Policy with a Master in Public Administration and Management degree in 2013.

Personal life
Yeo is of Teochew descent, where his ancestral hometown is Chaoan District, Chaozhou.

Career

Education
Yeo started his career in 1987 as a teacher at Nanyang Junior College, and in 1991, he became a Head of Department at Anderson Secondary School. From 1993 to 1996, he was a Specialist Inspector for Chinese at the Ministry of Education.

Labour Movement 
In 1997, he joined the labour movement as an Executive Secretary for the Building Construction and Timber Industries Employees Union (BATU). In 2001, he moved on to become the Executive Secretary for Singapore Industrial and Services Employees Union (SISEU). In 2007, he became the Executive Secretary for the Amalgamated Union of Statutory Board Employees (AUSBE).

In January 2014, Yeo was appointed Assistant Secretary-General (ASG) in the NTUC, which has close ties with the Singapore government.

In December 2016, Yeo was promoted to Assistant Director-General in NTUC.

Yeo is also the chairman of the NTUC's Migrant Workers' Centre, which was set up in 2009. He is also the head of the Centre for Domestic Employees, and the director for Workplace Safety and Health.

Yeo was president of the Consumers Association of Singapore (CASE), a consumer advocacy group founded by the NTUC, until June 2012. Some have criticized CASE for being toothless.

Politics 
Yeo joined a 5th member of Cheng San GRC  and managed to obtain 54.8% of the votes which he became 
a Member of Parliament for Cheng San GRC of Punggol South ward from 1997 to 2001.

In 2001, he joined a 5th member PAP team in Aljunied GRC which resulted in a walkover in 2001 general election and managed to obtain a 56.09% in the 2006 general election and became 
a Member of Parliament for Aljunied GRC for Aljuined—Hougang ward from 2001 to 2011 and joined a 6th member PAP team for Ang Mo Kio GRC and obtained 69.33% in the 2011 general election became 
a Member of Parliament for  Ang Mo Kio GRC for Ang Mo Kio—Hougang ward from 2011 to 2015. During the 2015 general election, he led the PAP team for Aljunied GRC, but have only obtained 49.04% of the votes against the Worker's Party team with 50.96% of the votes.

Prior to 2020 general election, he retired from politics. He is currently a board member at the Agri-Food and Veterinary Authority of Singapore.

He was a former Member of the Parliament of Singapore from 1997 to 2015. He is currently the Assistant Director-General in the National Trades Union Congress (NTUC).

He also used to be a board member at the Public Utilities Board, Land Transport Authority, and SPRING Singapore.

Private sector 

Yeo currently holds directorships in Asiagate Holdings and SIIC Environment Holding.

He was previously a director in other private companies, including Neo Group, Asia Water Technology, HLH Group, Japan Foods Holding, Grandwork Interior, Eco3 Tech & Engineering, Advance SCT, NAFA-Asiagate Education Corporation, Eco-World Biotechnology, Esplanade, China Gaoxian Fibre Fabric Holdings, Singapore Chinese Orchestra, and United Envirotech.

References

1961 births
Living people
Singaporean people of Teochew descent
Members of the Parliament of Singapore
People's Action Party politicians
National University of Singapore alumni
Nanyang Junior College alumni
Hwa Chong Institution alumni
Singaporean trade unionists